In the Royal Navy, the fleet flagship is, in practice, the warship designated as the fleet's most prestigious vessel, currently  .

Finally, the flag reverted to an aircraft carrier when  took up her position in January 2021.

Flagships in the Royal Navy 
Technically, the fleet flagship would be the ship that would host the two-star maritime battlestaff headquarters (such as COMUKMARFOR, a Rear Admiral who normally is based ashore) for operations. 

Generally, a flagship is a ship in which an Admiral (or a Commodore) flies his flag (or broad pennant). As, in the Royal Navy, shore establishments can be commissioned as warships, the term can also indicate that of shore establishments run by senior Royal Naval commanders. For example, in 1960, the Commanders-in-Chief of the Home Fleet and its successors the Western Fleet, and Commander-in-Chief Fleet, flew their flags ashore in HMS Warrior in Northwood, before the downgraded three-star Fleet Commander moved to Portsmouth in 2005. Since then the Fleet Commander has flown his flag from these headquarters at the shore establishment .

"National Flagship" 
In 2021 the UK Government announced plans for a new "national flagship" crewed and run by the RN that despite this designation would not be a command ship but a replacement for the Royal Yacht Britannia. The plans were abandoned in November 2022.

Historic flagships

Modern fleet flagships

See also
 List of flagships

References

Royal Navy